A Gander at Mother Goose is a 1940 Warner Bros. Merrie Melodies cartoon directed by Tex Avery and written by Dave Monahan. The short was released on May 25, 1940.

Plot 
The short is essentially a spot gag cartoon with nursery rhymes. The cartoon is narrated by Robert C. Bruce.

The first nursery rhyme is Mary, Mary Quite Contrary as played by Katharine Hepburn. The narrator speaks the first line of the rhyme: "Mary, Mary, Quite Contrary----how does your garden grow?" to which Mary replies "I'm terribly sorry, but confidentially, it stinks." (a reference to a line from the 1938 comedy film You Can't Take It with You). It is then revealed that the garden is full of litter, trash and filth

The page turns to Humpty Dumpty. Humpty, like the rhyme says, falls off the wall and appears unharmed. However, when he gets up it is revealed that his butt cheeks are exposed.

The next page shows Jack and Jill as teen sweethearts. As the narrator recites the rhyme, Jack and Jill go behind the well. The narrator is stumped and repeats "to fetch a pail of water" but nothing happens. The narrator does it again and Jack comes down with lipstick kiss marks on his face and says "The heck with the water" and runs back behind the well.

In the next scene, the rhyme is Little Miss Muffet. As the spider prepares to pounce on Little Miss Muffet, her unprepossessing looks frighten the arachnid off.

The scene is moved along to The Three Little Pigs. The pigs scurry into the house and the Big Bad Wolf. As the Wolf starts to blow the house down, one of the pigs opens the door and hands him a bottle of Histerine (a parody of Listerine). The wolf, now upset, yells "Why don't some of my best friends tell me these things!" and takes a dose of the mouth rinse.

The next scene involves the Parade of Wooden Soldiers. The narrator compliments the uniform marching but it is soon revealed that they are walking rather sloppily and are all wobbly. (A gag reused from Detouring America)

It then takes the story to Star Light, Star Bright with a dog that wishes for a tree.

The next rhyme is Jack Be Nimble as Jack jumps over the candlestick. He then brags "Aww, there's nothin' to it. Just fast. Speedy, that's me. Flames didn't even touch me". As Jack turns and walks away his butt has actually been burned by the candle.

The Old Woman Who Lived in a Shoe struggles to take care of her kids and the camera then pans over to her husband who is sitting in a chair relaxing while reading a newspaper as the song "What's The Matter with Father" plays in the background.

The next scene features Little Hiawatha. Hiawatha then shoots his arrow into the air like the poem implies. Soon an eagle lands next to Hiawatha and returns his arrow that apparently hit him in the tail feather.

The final rhyme in the short is The Night Before Christmas. Inside a house two mice are apparently still stirring. The first mouse whispers, "Merry Christmas". The other mouse then angrily yells, "QUIET!" ending the cartoon with the embarrassed mouse when it ends with irises out.

References

External links

1940 animated films
1940 films
Films directed by Tex Avery
Merrie Melodies short films
1940s Warner Bros. animated short films